Model United Nations (also Model UN or MUN) is a conference format that aims to simulate the procedures of the United Nations. Students participate as "Delegates" to various UN Committees and other bodies of the UN system. Participants research and formulate political positions based on the countries' actual positions. Model United Nations was formed from the Model League of Nations. As of 2012, there were an estimated 400 MUN conferences worldwide.

Unofficial databases of Model United Nations conferences 
While there is no official repository of Model United Nations conferences, there are several online resources that list Model United Nations conferences, most notably Best Delegate and MyMUN, which list conferences worldwide. THIMUN Foundation has a similar database dedicated to THIMUN-affiliated interscholastic conferences. National databases also exist, such as model-un.de for conferences in Germany, MUNation for conferences in Sri Lanka, and a Facebook page called "MUN Dae Jun" for conferences in the Republic of Korea. While some of these resources editorialize their databases, others allow conference hosts to submit and advertise their own conferences.

List of interscholastic MUN conferences 
The high school-level conferences in this list:

 have been held for at least five annual editions (established no later than 2017)
 are still active to this day, with a conference taking place within the past academic year.

List of intercollegiate MUN conferences 

The university-level conferences in this list:

 have been held for at least five annual editions (established no later than 2017)
 are still active to this day, with a conference taking place within the past academic year.

See also 
 Model United Nations

References

External links 
 MyMUN's Conference Database
 Best Delegate's Conference Database

Model United Nations
Model United Nations